Angue or Angüe is a surname. Notable people with the surname include: 

María Nsué Angüe (1945–2017), Equatoguinean writer and Minister of Education
Gerardo Angüe Mangue, Equatoguinean political activist
Purificación Angue Ondo Equatoguinean, diplomat

See also
Angüés